Durr is a surname which may refer to:

 Asia Durr (born 1997), American basketball player
 Clifford Durr (1899–1975), American civil rights lawyer
 Edward Durr (born 1963), American politician from New Jersey
 Jason Durr (born 1967), British actor
 Virginia Foster Durr, a former American civil rights activist

See also
 Shajar al-Durr (died 1257), ruler of Egypt
 Dürr, a list of people with the surname
 Dürr AG, a global mechanical and plant engineering firm based in Stuttgart, Germany
 Tom Dwan, professional poker player is also known (especially online) by the nickname "durrrr"
 Duerr (disambiguation)
 Dur (disambiguation)
 Dirr (disambiguation)
 Dir (disambiguation)

Surnames from nicknames